Hany Manuel Tadros (born September 30, 1956) is an Egyptian-Canadian singer, songwriter, actor, comedian and voice actor. He currently works and lives in Quebec.

Early life
Tadros was born in Cairo, Egypt to a Christian family. His father, Emmanuel Saadi Tadros, was a Copt, and his mother, Suzette Sawaya, was of Lebanese descent. Tadros's parents immigrated to Quebec when he was ten years old. His father bought him a guitar when he was 12 and he started composing and singing, eventually performing at the Vieux Damas venue in Saint Vincent.

Career 
His fame began to grow after he took part in Première chance, a TV program hosted by Fernand Gignac for new talents, in which he sang "Je t'aime, tu sais". Soon after this, he released his first album Manuel Tadros which featured the song "Un trésor de velours" that topped the Quebec charts. He was also known for his song "Isabelle". Tadros also hosted the variety shows Jeunesse and Pop Express between 1982 and 1984 on Télé Métropole.

Toward the end of the 1970s and throughout the 1980s Tadros turned to writing songs for other artists, including the hit tune "C'est zéro" for Julie Masse. He also wrote for Véronic Dicaire, Roch Voisine, Nicole Martin, Patrick Norman and Natasha St-Pier and for shows including Cirque du Soleil's Alegria

At the beginning of the 1990s, Tadros diversified, doing voice-overs for movies and TV series. He acted on stage including in the 2001 play Roméo et Juliette, de la Haine à l'Amour. He also hosted the educational magazine Code d’accès between 1998 and 2000.

Tadros wrote the French versions of the music in Chicago in 2003 (including the French-language musical comedy adaptation of the film) and Nostalgia in 2004. He is the voice of Rodrigo Borgia in the Ubisoft game Assassin's Creed II and its follow-up Assassin's Creed: Brotherhood in addition to the short film Assassin's Creed: Lineage. He has dubbed close to 750 films and series.

Personal life 
Tadros is a founding member and administrator of ArtistI, an organization that oversees the payment of royalties to artists. Diabetic from a very young age, he is known for his involvement as a spokesman for Fondation de la recherche sur le diabète juvénile (FRDJ) for many years.

Manuel Tadros is the father of Quebec film director and actor Xavier Dolan.

Filmography
1996: Omerta, la loi du silence as Frank Vastelli(TV series)
1997: Omerta 2, la loi du silence as Frank Vastelli (TV series)
1997: Twist of Fate as Dr. Hassan
1998: Pendant ce temps... as a Mafioso
1998: Meurtrière par amour (The Girl Next Door) as Carlo (TV)
1999: Omertà 3, Le dernier des hommes d'honneur as Frank Vastelli (TV series)
1999: Bonanno: A Godfather's Story as Mimi Sebella (TV)
2000: La Promesse
2001: The Warden as Diaz (TV)
2002: Le Dernier Chapitre as Carlos Vasquez (TV series)
2002: Aime ton père (English title A Loving Father) as M. Azouz (film)
2002-2005: Watatatow as Luigi Del Vecchio (TV series)
2003: Comment ma mère accoucha de moi durant sa ménopause as a Biologist
2003: Au-delà des frontières (Beyond Borders) as a Chechen mobster
2005: La Vie avec mon père as a doctor
2005: Human Trafficking (Trafic d'innocence) as Miguel, a Mexican smuggler (TV series)
2008: Le piège américain as Joseph Valachi
2008: Casino as Kia (TV)
2009: Assassin's Creed: Lineage as Rodrigo Borgia  (short film)
2009: I Killed My Mother (J'ai tué ma mère) as a concierge
2010: L'Appât as MC
2013: Tom at the Farm (Tom à la ferme) as the bartender
2016: X-Men: Apocalypse as  Clan Akkaba Leader 
2020: The Sticky Side of Baklava (La Face cachée du baklava)

Video games 
2009: Assassin's Creed II as Rodrigo Borgia 
2010: Assassin's Creed: Brotherhood as Rodrigo Borgia

Theater and musical comedies
1995: Le Bijou
1998: A vos souhaits
1998: Jerusalem the Musical
2000: Un cadeau du ciel
2002: Roméo et Juliette, de la Haine à l'Amour as Prince of Verona
2004: Nostalgia

References

External links

20th-century Canadian male singers
Canadian songwriters
Male actors from Quebec
Egyptian people of Lebanese descent
Canadian people of Coptic descent
Canadian people of Lebanese descent
1956 births
Living people
Canadian male stage actors
Canadian male film actors
Canadian male television actors
20th-century Canadian male actors
21st-century Canadian male actors
Egyptian emigrants to Canada